Tor Bade Pran Kande (Assamese: তোৰ বাদে প্ৰাণ কান্দে ) is a 2008 Indian Goalparia language romantic drama video film written and directed by Robin Ch Roy, starring Azibur Rahman, Rupa Khatun and Tumpa Roy in the lead roles with Nuruddin Mollah playing an important supporting role.

Cast
Azibur Rahman as Raju
Tumpa as Aleya
Rupa Khatun as Rupa
Nuruddin Mollah as Aleya's Father
Bappi Khan as Biki
Monsur Ali as Guru
Shahidur as Kalu
Hosena as Village Girl
Mohiruddin as Baul
Bapi as Raju's friend
Ayaan Anisur as Babu

References

External links

2008 films
Indian romantic drama films
Films set in Assam
2008 romantic drama films